Arthur Collinge (28 July 1897 – 1971) was an English footballer who played for Rochdale when they joined the Football League in 1921.

References

Rochdale A.F.C. players
English footballers
1897 births
1971 deaths
Footballers from Rochdale
Association football forwards